Christopher Keith Schroder (born August 20, 1978) is an American former professional baseball relief pitcher. He attended Oklahoma City University. Bob Carpenter coined him one of the 'er boys' along with Chris Booker and Ryan Wagner.

Baseball career
Schroder was known as a strikeout pitcher. In , he made it to the majors with the Washington Nationals, and appeared in 21 games, pitching 28 innings and recording 39 strikeouts. But he also walked 15 and allowed 7 homers. All told, by the end of 2006, he had pitched 97 innings in Triple-A Columbus with 121 K's.

He started  at Triple-A Columbus, and improved his home run problem—in 26 games he threw 33 innings, striking out 45. While he still conceded 18 walks, he did not surrender any home runs, posting an ERA of 1.64. On June 20, he was called up to the Nationals.

Schroder was the winning pitcher in the August 7, game between the Nationals and the San Francisco Giants. It was in this game that Barry Bonds hit his 756th home run off Schroder's teammate, Mike Bacsik, breaking the 33-year-old record held by Hank Aaron for most career home runs. The Nationals won 8-6.

He signed a one-year deal with the Athletics in November 2008. He did not make the 2009 Opening Day roster and was designated for assignment on April 8, 2009, to make room for newly claimed pitcher Dan Giese. In October 2009 Schroder was granted free agency. On January 11, 2010 Schroder signed a minor league contract with the Florida Marlins.

External links

Sportsnet player stats

1978 births
Living people
American expatriate baseball players in Canada
Baseball players from Oklahoma
Brevard County Manatees players
Clinton LumberKings players
Columbus Clippers players
Edmonton Trappers players
Gulf Coast Nationals players
Harrisburg Senators players
Jupiter Hammerheads players
Major League Baseball pitchers
New Orleans Zephyrs players
Oklahoma City Stars baseball players
People from Okarche, Oklahoma
Peoria Javelinas players
Peoria Saguaros players
Potomac Nationals players
Sacramento River Cats players
Vermont Expos players
Washington Nationals players